Old Airport Road is the second solo album by Clay Harper (formerly of the Coolies and founder of Fellini's Pizza, located in Atlanta). It features a cover of Beautiful. Glenn Phillips appears on track 7 as a featured artist.

Track listing
Ole Ray
Roly Poly
Crazy
Get that Money
Beautiful
Fuck Who You Want
Old Airport Road
I Can Find You At The Airport
They Played Amazing Grace

Musicians
 Clay Harper (vocals)
 Kevin McFoy Dunn (guitar)
 James Cobb (bass, keyboards)
 Paul Barrie (drums)
 Mike Barry (trumpet)
 Mark Bencuya (piano)
 Eric Fontaine (saxophone)
 Duane Trucks (drums on #2 and #6)
 Kevin Scott (bass on #2 and #6)
 Chris Case (piano on #2 and #6)
 Gary Lee Miller (drums on #8)

References

2013 albums